Cyttopsis is a genus of fishes.

Species
There are currently two recognized species in this genus:
 Cyttopsis cypho (Fowler, 1934) (Little dory)
 Cyttopsis rosea (R. T. Lowe, 1843) (Rosy dory)

References

Zeiformes